Bullock Harbour or Bulloch Harbour is a small working harbour located near the heritage town of Dalkey on the southeast coast of Dublin Bay in Ireland.

The current harbour quay and walls were constructed of local granite in the early 19th century where previously a rocky inlet had provided a natural harbour.  Bullock Harbour is the subject of a specific local objective (SLO22) in the Dun Laoghaire Rathdown County Council's county development plan.

History

Bullock, a small fishing village, has been known to many races, since pre-Christian Druids first built a standing stone circle here (since quarried to build the Martello towers). The name is said to derive from the Scandinavian for "Blue Haven" and again from the Gaelic word for a tidal blow hole which existed in the rocks. The land at Bullock was given to the Cistercian monks by an Irish king 'beyond the memory of man'. Fishing rights came with the land and it was to protect these lucrative fisheries from the Wicklow tribes that Bullock Castle was built in the 12th century and around the castle grew up a tiny town, completely walled and protected at intervals by towers.

Name
The name of the harbour and castle has variously been called Bullock, Bloyke and Bullog.

Location
Bulloch Harbour is located at the Sandycove (northern) end of Harbour Road in Dalkey, County Dublin.  Bulloch Castle, an imposing Norman structure, overlooks the harbour which is ten minutes walk from Dalkey Dart Station.

Harbour activities
There are two businesses offering boats for hire for fishing, sightseeing or to visit Dalkey Island, about a kilometre away.  Lobster and crabs are harvested when weather permits, and mackerel is fished for in season.

Marine leisure activities include kayaking, sea scouts, sea fishing and angling, and rock climbing.

Wildlife
A family of seals live at the harbour and like being fed by local children and tourists. Common and bottleneck dolphins have been reported in the vicinity. The diversity of marine flora and fauna reflects that of the Dalkey coastline.

References

External links
 Bulloch Harbour Crane

Ports and harbours of the Republic of Ireland